The statue of José Gervasio Artigas is installed in Mexico City's Plaza Uruguay, in Mexico. The sculpture is made of bronze.

References

External links

 

Bronze sculptures in Mexico
José Gervasio Artigas
Monuments and memorials in Mexico City
Outdoor sculptures in Mexico City
Polanco, Mexico City
Sculptures of men in Mexico
Statues in Mexico City